The Montawa dwarf gecko (Hemiphyllodactylus montawaensis) is a species of gecko. It is endemic to Myanmar.

References

Hemiphyllodactylus
Reptiles described in 2017
Reptiles of Myanmar
Endemic fauna of Myanmar